Karli may refer to:

Places
Karlı, Ardanuç, village in Turkey
Karli-Eli, historical name of a region in Greece
Karlı, Vezirköprü, village in Turkey
Karli, Koper, settlement in Slovenia
Karli, India, village in India
Karla Caves, a complex of ancient Buddhist Indian rock-cut architecture cave shrines
Karlı, Çan
Karlı, Keşan

Other
Eupithecia karli, moth family
Karli (name)

See also

Karly
Karri (disambiguation)